Alphina is a genus of planthoppers in the family Fulgoridae occurring in the New World.

Species
 Alphina nigrosignata Stål, 1863
 Alphina fryi Distant, 1906

Nomina dubia
 Alphina glauca (Metcalf, 1923); considered a likely synonym of Calyptoproctus marmoratus

References 

Auchenorrhyncha genera
Poiocerinae